Pechatniki District is an administrative district (raion), one of the twelve in South-Eastern Administrative Okrug of the federal city of Moscow, Russia. As of the 2010 Census, the total population of the district was 83,403.

Municipal status
As a municipal division, it is incorporated as Pechatniki Municipal Okrug.

References

Notes

Sources

Districts of Moscow
South-Eastern Administrative Okrug
